"Let's Go to San Francisco" is the only UK-charting single by the British pop group The Flower Pot Men. The song was written and produced by John Carter and Ken Lewis, engineered by John Mackswith and released in 1967 on 7" single format. Carter also sang the lead vocal in the recording. It is regarded as a work of the 1960s California Sound.

Reception
The song was a Top 10 hit single in a number of countries. It peaked at No. 12 in New Zealand, No. 9 in Norway, No. 8 in Ireland and No. 4 in the United Kingdom. Carter and Burrows were part of the First Class' single "Beach Baby," which quotes the melody of "Let's Go To San Francisco" at the end.

A light-hearted pastiche of the work of Brian Wilson, the song achieved a similar musical level and has remained popular. The song could be mistaken for a Beach Boys single.

Compilation album usage
The song has since appeared on many "best of the '60s" compilation albums since its release, such as the 1997 Polygram TV release The First Summer Of Love: SIXTIES.

In 1987 Dino Music released a cover version of "Let’s Go to San Francisco" by German pop group Musicbox.
The band produced a video clip for television release containing several original 1960s cars, typical hippie clothing, and a small airplane. 
Musicbox was successful in the German, Austrian, and Swiss markets with cover versions of so-called "one hit wonders."

Italian covers
There were two different versions with different texts written in Italian; the more famous was "Inno," performed by the Milanese band Dik Dik. There was also "Trovare un mondo" ("To find a world"), sung by a little-known artist, Mimmo Diamante, and published by ARC, a subsidiary label of RCA Italiana.

Other Covers
British band Psykick Holiday did a cover in 2017 to mark the 50th anniversary of peace & Love & song . It was a double 'A' single with Scott McKenzie's 'San Francisco' being the other track. The band also did a summer of love EP featuring French & Spanish version of the two songs.
In 2020 & 2022 the English tracks came out under main vocalist with the above band Vanessa White Smith on the Compilations 'Femme Fatales of music Vol.1 & 2. All releases were on Future Legend Records and out on iTunes etc.

References

1967 singles
Deram Records singles
Songs written by John Carter (musician)
Songs written by Ken Lewis (songwriter)
Songs about San Francisco
1967 songs
California Sound
Tony Burrows songs